Oujda Angads Airport  is an airport serving Oujda, a city in the Oriental region in Morocco. it is located about  north of Oujda and about  northeast of Casablanca, near the Algerian border.

History
During World War II, the airport was used as a military airfield by the Royal Air Force (RAF) and United States Army Air Forces Twelfth Air Force during the North African campaign. It was called RAF Oujda and Oujda Airfield Known units assigned were:

 HQ 5th Bombardment Wing, December 1942 – January 1943
 HQ 52d Troop Carrier Wing, 8 May – July 1943
 68th Reconnaissance Group, November 1942 – 24 March 1943 (Various photo-reconnaissance aircraft)
 313th Troop Carrier Group, 9 May – 16 June 1943 C-47 Skytrain
 319th Bombardment Group, 3 March – 25 April 1943 B-26 Marauder
 350th Fighter Group, 6 January – 14 February 1943 P-39/P-400 Airacobra

After the Americans moved out their active units in mid-1943, the airport was used as a stopover and landing field for Air Transport Command aircraft on the Casablanca-Algiers transport route.  When WWII ended the control of the airfield was returned to civil authorities.

Facilities

Airlines and destinations
The following airlines operate regular scheduled and charter flights at Oujda-Angads Airport:

Traffic statistics

References

External links
 
 

Airports in Morocco
Oujda
Buildings and structures in Oriental (Morocco)
Airfields of the United States Army Air Forces in Morocco
World War II airfields in Morocco